George Fraser may also refer to:
 George Fraser (New Zealand engineer) (1832–1901), New Zealand engineer, foundry proprietor and ship owner
 George Fraser (Canadian football) (1911–1992), Canadian football player
 George Fraser (footballer) (1881–1951), Scottish football player and manager
 George Fraser (horticulturist) (1854–1944), British horticulturist, hybridizer of rhododendrons

 George MacDonald Fraser (1925–2008), British author
 George R. Fraser (born 1932), medical geneticist
 George Sutherland Fraser (1915–1980), British poet
 George Willoughby Fraser (1866–1923), British civil engineer and Egyptologist
 George Henry Fraser (died 1919), navigator and aircraft mechanic
 George Arthur Fraser (1866–1930), Canadian politician

See also
 George Fraser Kerr (1895–1929), Canadian recipient of the Victoria Cross
 George Frazier (disambiguation)